Denys Yuriyovych Rylskyi (born 12 May 1989) is a Ukrainian former professional footballer who is the goalkeeper coach for Alliance United in League1 Ontario.

Playing career 
Rylskyi began his career in 2009 with FC Kryvbas-2 Kryvyi Rih where he appeared in a total of three matches. In 2012, he signed with FC Dynamo Khmelnytskyi in the Ukrainian Second League. Midway through the season he signed with FC Naftovyk-Ukrnafta Okhtyrka of the Ukrainian First League. In 2013, he returned to the Second League to play with FC Skala Stryi. In 2015, he played abroad with Toronto Atomic FC in the Canadian Soccer League.

In 2018, he played with CSC Mississauga. He played in one league match, as well as two playoff matches in 2019 in League1 Ontario with Alliance United FC.

Managerial career 
In 2017, he was named the player/coach for Ukraine AC in the Arena Premier League.In 2018, he served as a goalkeeper coach for Alliance United in League1 Ontario.

References

External links
 

1989 births
Living people
Ukrainian footballers
Association football goalkeepers
FC Dnipro-75 Dnipropetrovsk players
FC Kryvbas Kryvyi Rih players
FC Dynamo Khmelnytskyi players
FC Naftovyk-Ukrnafta Okhtyrka players
FC Skala Stryi (2004) players
Toronto Atomic FC players
Alliance United FC players
Canadian Soccer League (1998–present) players
Ukrainian First League players
Ukrainian Second League players
Ukrainian Amateur Football Championship players
Ukrainian expatriate footballers
Expatriate soccer players in Canada
Ukrainian expatriate sportspeople in Canada
Ukrainian football managers
Ukrainian expatriate football managers
Expatriate soccer managers in Canada